Filippo Spitoni (born 17 April 1984 in Fabriano) is an Italian professional footballer who currently plays as a goalkeeper for AC Pavia.

Notes

1984 births
Living people
Italian footballers
Vis Pesaro dal 1898 players
S.S. Fidelis Andria 1928 players
A.C. Bellaria Igea Marina players
Association football goalkeepers